Robert Christopher Ndlovu was installed as the Roman Catholic Archbishop of Harare on 21 August 2004.

Education and career
Ndlovu was born on 25 December 1955 at Tshongokwe, Matabeleland, Rhodesia. He was educated at the Marist Brothers Dete in the Hwange diocese before entering the Major Seminary at Chishawasha.  He was ordained a priest on 28 August 1983 at the age of twenty-seven in Hwange, Zimbabwe.

On 9 February 1999, aged forty-three, he was appointed Bishop of Hwange and consecrated three months later.

Archbishop of Harare
On 10 June 2004, aged forty-eight, Ndlovu was appointed Archbishop of Harare and installed on 21 August 2004.

Ndlovu has openly criticised the regime in Zimbabwe for forced evictions and other human rights abuses. He has stated that the "role of a bishop and of the church in general is to stand up for human dignity, and from human dignity flow human rights".  This has angered some in the government who respond that the Archbishop is sowing seeds of tribal discord. In August 2020 the Papal Nuncio for Zimbabwe visited the archbishop, and expressed solidarity for his positions on the treatment of Zimbabwean citizens.

Service roles
Ndlovu serves as Chancellor of the Zimbabwe Catholic University. He also founded the Mother Patrick Primary School at Waterfalls.

As Archbishop of Harare, Ndlovu is President of the Zimbabwe Catholic Bishops' Conference (ZCBC).

In May 2011, Ndlovu consecrated the St Bakhita Catholic centre for the disabled at Makumbi.

References

External links

Profile at Catholic Hierarchy website

1955 births
Living people
21st-century Roman Catholic archbishops in Zimbabwe
People from Harare
Roman Catholic bishops of Hwange
Roman Catholic archbishops of Harare
Zimbabwean Roman Catholic archbishops